Scott Turner (born 15 April 1988) is a professional rugby league footballer who most recently played for Featherstone Rovers in the Kingstone Press Championship.

Turner has previously played at the Dewsbury Rams and Sheffield Eagles in the Championship.

References

External links
Featherstone Rovers profile
Sheffield Eagles profile

Living people
1988 births
English rugby league players
Rugby league wingers
Rugby league fullbacks
Rugby league centres
Featherstone Rovers players
Dewsbury Rams players
North Wales Crusaders players
Sheffield Eagles players